is a Brazilian-born Japanese photographer and internet celebrity. She was previously a hairdresser, track cyclist, and homemaker.

Early life and education 
Kimiko Nishimoto was born in Brazil in 1928. Her parents taught agriculture to locals. She was the second daughter of 7 siblings. At the age of 8, her family moved to Kumamoto. She graduated from beauty school.

Career 
Nishimoto worked as a hairdresser in her father's salon where she specialized in bridal and Japanese coiffure. After 4 years working as a hairdresser, Nishimoto attended cycling school and became licensed as a professional cyclist. From the age of 22 to 27, she competed nationally as a track cyclist with her younger 2 brothers.

In 2001, Nishimoto began her career as an amateur photographer after taking a photography and image processing course taught by her eldest son. In 2011, she had her first solo exhibit at the Kumamoto Prefectural Museum of Art. In 2018, she had an exhibition named "Asobokane?" at the Shinjuku. , Nishimoto had developed a social media presence, with over 220,000 followers of her Instagram account.

Personal life 
At the age of 27, Nishimoto married Hitoshi, a tax official, and they raised their 3 children in Kyushu. She was a homemaker for over 45 years. Nishimoto's husband died in 2012 of lung cancer.  , Nishimoto resides in Kumamoto Prefecture. In reference to her longevity, Nishimoto stated that she is a daily cigarette smoker and drinks a tall glass of Bourbon whiskey every day.

References 

Living people
1928 births
Brazilian people of Japanese descent
Brazilian emigrants to Japan
Sportspeople from Kumamoto Prefecture
Japanese Internet celebrities
Japanese track cyclists
Japanese female cyclists
21st-century Japanese artists
21st-century women photographers
Japanese women photographers
Japanese hairdressers
Social media influencers